Vladimir Olegovich Nikitin (born 22 March 1990) is a Russian professional boxer. He is best known for winning a bronze medal at the 2016 Rio Olympics against Irish boxer Michael Conlan.

Amateur career
Nikitin gained a bronze medal in the 2013 European Amateur Boxing Championships, losing to gold medallist John Joe Nevin in the semi-final. Later that year, he won silver at the 2013 AIBA World Boxing Championships, losing in the final to Azerbaijan's Javid Chalabiyev.

In the 2016 Olympics Nikitin secured himself another medal by reaching the semi finals. His defeats of Chatchai Butdee and top seed Michael Conlan on judges decisions in the previous two rounds saw the Thai and Irish camps both question the integrity of the judges.  Nikitin withdrew from the semi-final due to injuries sustained from the Conlan fight, but took home a bronze medal.

Professional boxing record

References

Russian male boxers
Olympic boxers of Russia
Boxers at the 2016 Summer Olympics
AIBA World Boxing Championships medalists
Medalists at the 2016 Summer Olympics
Olympic medalists in boxing
Olympic bronze medalists for Russia
1990 births
Living people
People from Syktyvkar
Sportspeople from the Komi Republic
Bantamweight boxers